Vendramino Bariviera (25 October 1937 – 23 November 2001) was an Italian racing cyclist who competed in the individual road race at the 1960 Summer Olympics. After the Olympics he turned professional and won several stages of the Giro d'Italia in 1963, 1964 and 1966. He rode the 1964 Tour de France and retired in 1967. His younger brother Renzo was an Olympic basketball player.

References

1937 births
2001 deaths
Italian male cyclists
Italian Giro d'Italia stage winners
Olympic cyclists of Italy
Cyclists at the 1960 Summer Olympics
Cyclists from Rome
Cyclists from the Province of Verona